The International Society of Genetic Genealogy (ISOGG) is an independent non-commercial nonprofit organization of genetic genealogists run by volunteers. It was founded by a group of surname DNA project administrators in 2005 to promote DNA testing for genealogy. It advocates the use of genetics in genealogical research, provides educational resources for genealogists interested in DNA testing, and facilitates networking among genetic genealogists. , it comprises over 8,000 members in 70 countries. , regional meetings are coordinated by 20 volunteer regional coordinators located in the United States, Australia, Brazil, Canada, England, Egypt, Ireland and Russia.

ISOGG hosts the ISOGG Wiki, a free online encyclopedia maintained by ISOGG members which contains a wide variety of educational resources and guidance for genetic genealogy consumers and DNA project administrators. The ISOGG Wiki contains ethical guidelines for DNA project administrators and ISOGG members perform peer reviews of DNA project websites of other members on request, following which the websites may display the ISOGG Peer Reviewed graphic.

Industry regulation and standards
In 2008 ISOGG supported the passing of the Genetic Information Nondiscrimination Act designed to prohibit the improper use of genetic information in health insurance and employment in the United States. At an FDA public meeting on oversight of laboratory developed tests, ISOGG opposed FDA regulations preventing consumer access to DTC testing. 

An article published in Genetics in Medicine in March 2012 provides an overview of the diverse array of tests and practices in the emerging DTC genetic genealogy industry. In the article, the authors highlight ISOGG's potential role in developing industry best practice guidelines and consumer guidance: 

The increasing affordability and popularity of DTC genetic genealogy testing has also raised ethical concerns about genealogists testing the DNA of others without consent. The ISOGG Wiki contains a selection of external resources on ethics for genetic genealogists.

Y-STR nomenclature

ISOGG promotes the adoption of voluntary industry Y-STR nomenclature standards developed by NIST and published in the Journal of Genetic Genealogy in 2008.

Citizen science
ISOGG members such as Leo Little, Roberta Estes, Rebekah Canada and Bonnie Schrack have been involved in important citizen science discoveries regarding human phylogeny and ethnic origins. The broader ISOGG membership participated in the Genographic Project, a genetic anthropology study that used crowdsourcing to facilitate new discoveries about human genetic history, and other genetic databases where broader and larger databases aid the identification of participants' ancestral origins.

Y chromosome phylogenetic tree

Since 2006 ISOGG has hosted the regularly updated online ISOGG Y-chromosome phylogenetic tree. ISOGG aims to keep the tree as up-to-date as possible, incorporating new SNPs which are being discovered frequently. The ISOGG tree has been described by academics as using the accepted nomenclature for human Y-chromosome DNA haplogroups and subclades in that it follows the Y Chromosome Consortium nomenclature as described in Karafet et al. 2008, The ISOGG tree is widely cited in peer reviewed academic literature.

See also

Genealogical DNA test
Genetic diversity
Human genetics
Human genetic variation
Human mitochondrial DNA haplogroups
Human Y-chromosome DNA haplogroups
Mitochondrial Eve
Y-chromosomal Adam
Y-chromosome haplogroups in populations of the world
Personal genomics

ISOGG Mission Statement
History of genetic genealogy on the ISOGG wiki

References

External links
 Y-DNA Haplogroup Tree at ISOGG

International non-profit organizations
Genetic genealogy
Citizen science
Scientific organizations established in 2005